Strathmore Park is a suburb of Wellington City, New Zealand. It is located at the southern end of the Miramar Peninsula to the south of the suburb of Miramar, and due east of the airport. A hill suburb, it overlooks Lyall Bay (which lies to the west), Evans Bay (to the North) and several bays along the Seatoun coast close to the mouth of Wellington Harbour, which lies to the east.

Strathmore Park is noted for several areas of open land, including the Beacon Hill Reserve and Miramar Golf Course. The southern end of the suburb is dominated by Atatürk Park, which is located high above Tarakena Bay. The site was chosen for its similarity to the landscape of Gallipoli, and was erected as part of a joint agreement with the Turkish and Australian governments in mutual respect of the men of both sides who lost their lives in the Gallipoli Campaign of World War I. The Memorial was designed by Ian Bowman and unveiled in 1990.

History 
Strathmore Park grew after the private secondary school Scots College opened in 1919. From the 1930s it was the site of a state housing development. Many of the original state houses remain, particularly in Taiaroa Street and Raukawa Street.

Demographics 

Strathmore (Wellington City) had a population of 3,828 at the 2018 New Zealand census, an increase of 126 people (3.4%) since the 2013 census, and an increase of 60 people (1.6%) since the 2006 census. There were 1,350 households. There were 1,893 males and 1,935 females, giving a sex ratio of 0.98 males per female. The median age was 36.4 years (compared with 37.4 years nationally), with 825 people (21.6%) aged under 15 years, 750 (19.6%) aged 15 to 29, 1,875 (49.0%) aged 30 to 64, and 381 (10.0%) aged 65 or older.

Ethnicities were 61.4% European/Pākehā, 16.2% Māori, 17.2% Pacific peoples, 11.5% Asian, and 8.9% other ethnicities (totals add to more than 100% since people could identify with multiple ethnicities).

The proportion of people born overseas was 32.3%, compared with 27.1% nationally.

Although some people objected to giving their religion, 40.1% had no religion, 44.4% were Christian, 2.3% were Hindu, 3.0% were Muslim, 1.5% were Buddhist and 3.6% had other religions.

Of those at least 15 years old, 867 (28.9%) people had a bachelor or higher degree, and 486 (16.2%) people had no formal qualifications. The median income was $32,200, compared with $31,800 nationally. The employment status of those at least 15 was that 1,542 (51.3%) people were employed full-time, 447 (14.9%) were part-time, and 171 (5.7%) were unemployed.

Education

Though primarily a day school, it hosts a small boarding house. Scots College became a co-educational school in 2021, having previously only admitted boys.

References

Suburbs of Wellington City